Abarema josephi is a species of plant in the family Fabaceae. It is known only from the type locality in Caquetá, Colombia.

References

josephi
Vulnerable plants
Endemic flora of Colombia
Taxonomy articles created by Polbot